Chicka Chicka Boom Boom is a bestselling American children's picture book written by Bill Martin, Jr. and John Archambault, illustrated  by Lois Ehlert, and published in hardcover by Simon & Schuster in 1989. The book features anthropomorphized letters and charted on The New York Times Best Seller list for children's books in 2000.

Plot
The lowercase alphabet tries climbing up a coconut tree in order, until their weight causes the tree to lean over, and everyone falls out of the tree. After that, the uppercase alphabet (the older relatives of the lowercase alphabet) comes to rescue them. Again alphabetically, while being rescued, most of the letters receive injuries, including "d" having a skinned-knee, "e" having a stubbed toe, "f" being patched up, "g" being all out of breath, "h" and "i" being tangled up, "j" and "k" about to cry, "l" being knotted like a tie, "m" being looped, "n" being stooped, "o" being twisted "alley-oop," "p" having a black eye, and "t" having a loose tooth. However, the rest of the letters have no injuries. The sun goes down afterward. Later at night, when there is a full moon, the letter "a" starts to get out of bed and climbs up the tree again, daring all the other letters to catch him.

Impact
An audiobook version is also available, narrated by Ray Charles.

A CD-ROM game was released in 1995 by Davidson and Simon & Schuster Interactive.

A 2004 sequel entitled Chicka, Chicka, 1, 2, 3 by Martin and Michael Sampson was inspired by it. Also, a board book for toddlers entitled Chicka, Chicka, ABC was published in 1990, which contains the first half of the original story, and ends up with all 26 letters causing themselves to fall out of the coconut tree.

Weston Woods Studios made its own animated musical short film adaptation, which was inspired by the original book in 1999, with music composed and performed by Crystal Taliefero.

Album

In 1992, Archambault released an album composed of several songs based on the storybook entitled Chicka Chicka Boom Boom and Other Coconutty Songs, along with musician David Plummer. The album was named a 1992 "Notable Children's Recording American Library Association and in 1993, won a Parents' Choice Award. Its main track was the title song, Chicka Chicka Boom Boom, which was the book name.

Tracks

References

1989 children's books
American picture books
Alphabet books
Children's books adapted into films